The Second Tunisia Plan was an economic development plan implemented by the government of President Habib Bourguiba from 1965 to 1968.

The government invested about as much in agriculture as in industry.

See also
Economy of Tunisia
First Tunisia Plan
Third Tunisia Plan
Fourth Tunisia Plan
Fifth Tunisia Plan
Sixth Tunisia Plan
Seventh Tunisia Plan
Eighth Tunisia Plan
Ninth Tunisia Plan

References

Economic history of Tunisia